Rafael Díaz Justo (born 8 November 1972) is a Spanish racing cyclist. He rode in the 1999 Tour de France.

References

External links
 

1972 births
Living people
Spanish male cyclists
Place of birth missing (living people)
Sportspeople from the Province of Toledo
Cyclists from Castilla-La Mancha